Robert L. Fields (born October 20, 1949) is a retired professional basketball player who spent one season in the American Basketball Association (ABA) as a member of the Utah Stars (1971–72). He attended La Salle University where he was selected by the Portland Trail Blazers during the fourth round of the 1971 NBA draft, but he never played for them. He now coaches basketball at St. Albans School for Boys.

External links

1949 births
Living people
American men's basketball players
Basketball players from Chicago
Junior college men's basketball players in the United States
La Salle Explorers men's basketball players
Portland Trail Blazers draft picks
Utah Stars players